Nam Areal Ond Dina is a 2010 Indian Kannada-language romantic drama film directed by Aravind Kaushik and starring Anish Tejeshwar, Meghana Gaonkar, and Rakshit Shetty. The film began production in 2008 and released two years later. This film marked the acting debut of Gaonkar and Shetty and the directorial debut of Aravind Kaushik. This film was supposed to be the debut film of Tejeshwar, but Police Quarters ended up releasing first. Mandya Ramesh, Kuri Prathap, and Ravi Teja were cast in supporting roles and a song pictured on Ramesh was included in the film.

Plot 
The film is about a man, Chinna, who has no major goal in his life, runs after a girl named Chinnu. When she wants him to make Rs. 5000 a month, he manages to get the money illegally. Chinna faces more problems after he learns about Chinnu's other love interest, Aravind.

Cast 
Anish Tejeshwar as Chinna 
Meghana Gaonkar as Chinnu
Rakshit Shetty as Aravind
Mandya Ramesh
Kuri Prathap
Ravi Teja

Soundtrack 
The songs are composed by Arjun Janya. Regarding the songs, a critic from Rediff wrote that "While Nenapu is a melodious composition, the other songs -- by Arjun -- are just okay. Some of them could have been done away with".

Reception 

A critic from the Bangalore Mirror noted that "The director’s non-linear narration turns out to be the biggest asset of the film". A critic from Rediff gave the film a rating of three out of five stars and stated that "Colloquial dialogues by Arvind is another strong point. But the film could have had a better screenplay".

Legacy 
Gaonkar, Shetty, and Janya collaborated with Kaushik for his second film Tughlaq (2012). A sequel titled  Namma Arealli Innondu Dina began production in 2012.

References 

2010s Kannada-language films
2010 romantic drama films
2010 films
Indian romantic drama films
 2010 directorial debut films
Films directed by Aravind Kaushik